Lithostathine-1-beta is a protein that in humans is encoded by the REG1B gene.

Function 

This gene is a type I subclass member of the Reg gene family. The Reg gene family is a multigene family grouped into four subclasses, types I, II, III and IV based on the primary structures of the encoded proteins. This gene encodes a protein that is secreted by the exocrine pancreas. It is associated with islet cell regeneration and diabetogenesis and may be involved in pancreatic lithogenesis. Reg family members REG1A, REGL, PAP and this gene are tandemly clustered on chromosome 2p12 and may have arisen from the same ancestral gene by gene duplication.

References

Further reading